Topical Dancer is a studio album by Charlotte Adigéry and Bolis Pupul and co-written and produced by Soulwax. Released on 4 March 2022 under the label Deewee, Topical Dancer is Adigéry and Pupul's debut album as a duo.

Background 
Pupul and Adigéry are both based in Belgium with shared heritage from Martinique, a French island. They first met while working for the soundtrack of Belgica, a 2016 Belgian drama, after being invited by Soulwax, who also co-written and produced this album. The album is influenced by experiences of racial discrimination and sexual abuse. In the album, Adigéry sings in English, Dutch, Creole, and French. The album features Charlotte Adigéry's mother, Christiane Adigéry and was released under the label Deewee, which the duo previously released three EPs on. "Thank You" is the lead single of Topical Dancer and the second single is "Blenda". "Blenda" was released on 4 November 2021 along with an announcement of the album and its release date. The first track of the album "Bel Deewee" is a field recording of Adigéry entering the Deewee recording complex, which is also where they recorded the album, and calling through the intercom.

Critical reception 
{{Album ratings
| MC = 85/100
| rev1 = AllMusic
| rev1score = 
| rev2 = Beats Per Minute
| rev2score = 88/100
| rev3 = DIY
| rev3score = 
| rev4 = NME
| rev4score = 
| rev5 = Pitchfork
| rev5score = 8.2/10
| rev6 = The Observer
| rev6score = 
| rev7 = The Skinny| rev7score = 
}}
On the review aggregator Metacritic, which assigns a normalized rating out of 100 to reviews from professional publications, Topical Dancer received an average score of 85, based on six reviews, indicating "universal acclaim". Emily Mackay of The Observer called the album "banging fusion of funk, house and techno". Paul Simpson of AllMusic claimed the album was "catchiest and most danceable songs Adigéry and Pupul have written to date" and that the lyrics "offer a lot of food for thought". Eric Torres of Pitchfork called the album "riveting" and reported that the album had a "roguish charm". Jasper Willems wrote on Beats Per Minute that Topical Dancer is "spiritual palette cleanser as much as it is a physical one" and "a record for literally anyone". In a review written for NME'', reviewer Max Pilley claimed that the album "arrived bursting with positive energy".

Track listing
All tracks are written and produced by Charlotte Adigéry, Bolis Pupul (Boris Zeebroek) and Soulwax (David Dewaele and Stephen Dewaele).

Charts

Weekly charts

Year-end charts

References 

2022 debut albums
Electronic albums by Belgian artists
Soulwax albums